Mana Nopnech is a retired professional footballer from Thailand.

References
 Official team website

Living people
1981 births
Mana Nopnech
Mana Nopnech
Association football goalkeepers
Mana Nopnech
Mana Nopnech
Mana Nopnech
Mana Nopnech
Mana Nopnech
Mana Nopnech